The A650 is an electric multiple unit subway car built for use on the Los Angeles Metro Rail system. The cars were manufactured by the Italian company Breda at its Pistoia plant between 1988 and 1997 and are used on the Metro B and D Lines.

Details 
The fleet of 104 vehicles was supplied in two orders. The first batch of vehicles (fleet numbers 501–530) were built between 1988 and 1993 and are propelled by chopper control and DC motors designed and manufactured by Garrett Air Research, later supported by ABB. The second batch of vehicles (fleet numbers 531–604), were built between 1995 and 1997 and include 3-phase AC 4-pole asynchronous traction motors and VVVF inverter control using GTO thyristor technology, manufactured by General Electric. Both types of vehicles use electronic sliding pocket doors, air conditioning and braking systems built by Wabtec.

Costing $1.5 million each, the trains usually run in four to six car consists, and feature automatic train control, air conditioning, emergency intercoms, wheelchair spaces and emergency braking.

The fleet is maintained in a yard south of Union Station on Santa Fe Drive near 4th Street on the west bank of the Los Angeles River in Downtown Los Angeles.

Replacement 
The A650 series are expected to be replaced in 2024, which is the same year that the first phase of the Purple Line Extension opens. LACMTA has signed a contract with CRRC Changchun to acquire new heavy rail vehicles, dubbed the HR4000 series.

In popular culture 
Because Los Angeles is the home of many television and production agencies, A650 subway cars are featured in countless commercials, TV shows and movies.

The Breda A650 was depicted as being burned in the tunnel between MacArthur Park and Metro Center in the 1997 film Volcano, when a lava flow through the tunnel causes all passengers and conductor to pass out on board. The A650 was featured in Speed when the emergency brake feature stops and the train derails.

It is also featured in SWAT and it is seen taking a nosedive plummet from a mountain as the cataclysmic events of December 21, 2012, unfold in 2012.

See also 
Los Angeles Metro Rail rolling stock
CRRC HR4000
Budd Universal Transit Vehicle - A similar model operated by the Baltimore Metro SubwayLink and (formerly) Metrorail

References 

A650
Los Angeles Metro Rail
Electric multiple units of the United States
750 V DC multiple units
Train-related introductions in 1993